The Traitorous aka. Shaolin Traitorous is a 1976 Hong Kong film directed by Sung Ting-mei. It is a wuxia film starring Sammo Hung, Polly Kuan and Chang Yi.

Plot
The film portrays a conflict between a eunuch and two descendants of loyal ministers who are incriminated by the eunuch.

As a child, Yung witnesses the murder of his parents by three kung fu masters. His father, a Ming loyalist was kicked out of his political post and now a Ming traitor named Tin Erh Keng (portrayed by Chang Yi) and his two lieutenants magnificently ride in on horseback to finish them off. Sammo Hung and  Hau Pak-wai do most of the dirty work in a gruesome fight to the finish. Yung's mother dies wearing a bracelet with bells on it and this becomes an important plot device throughout the film as years later, he carries the bracelet and its sound reminds the killers of their deed. The child finds his way to Shaolin and patiently waits outside until admitted and is later accepted as a student by one of the elder monks. The training is painlessly short compared with other Shaolin tales and consists of carrying buckets up stairs, leaping out of pits, and actual combat training. One important skill is his ability to puncture objects with his fingers, as his main foe shares the same ability. Although the 'Bronzemen' make an appearance as statues, Yung has no trouble leaving the temple ready to find the killers and make mincemeat of them.

With his backstory told, Yung now becomes the nameless hero who wanders into town and aids the afflicted while searching for the killers. An unexpected foe comes in the form of a woman named Hsiao Yun-erh (Polly Kuan), Tin's adopted daughter. She challenges Yung in one of the better teahouse confrontations. The match is unresolved, although Yung has the upper hand in more ways than one. Ultimately, Yung has to deal with Hsiao, figure out a way to get past a wild kung fu multi-man formation known as the Tien Lo Set, and defeat the lieutenants in order to challenge Tin himself.

Cast and roles
 Carter Wong - adult Shang Yung
 Polly Kuan - Hsiao Yun-erh
 Chang Yi - Tin Erh Keng
 Sammo Hung - First Head

References

External links
 
 
The Traitorous at Hong Kong Cinemagic

Hong Kong martial arts films
Films set in 17th-century Ming dynasty
1976 martial arts films
Wuxia films
Hong Kong films about revenge
1970s Hong Kong films